Misfer Al-Bishi is a Saudi Arabian footballer. He currently plays for Al-Anwar as a midfielder.

References 

1988 births
Living people
Saudi Arabian footballers
Al-Shabab FC (Riyadh) players
Al-Hazem F.C. players
Al-Taawoun FC players
Al-Shoulla FC players
Al-Arabi SC (Saudi Arabia) players
Al-Kawkab FC players
Al-Sadd FC (Saudi football club) players
Al-Anwar Club players
Saudi First Division League players
Saudi Professional League players
Saudi Second Division players
Saudi Third Division players
Association football midfielders